Arithmetic topology is an area of mathematics that is a combination of algebraic number theory and topology. It establishes an analogy between number fields and closed, orientable 3-manifolds.

Analogies
The following are some of the analogies used by mathematicians between number fields and 3-manifolds:
A number field corresponds to a closed, orientable 3-manifold
Ideals in the ring of integers correspond to links, and prime ideals correspond to knots.
The field Q of rational numbers corresponds to the 3-sphere.

Expanding on the last two examples,  there is an analogy between knots and prime numbers in which one considers "links" between primes. The triple of primes  are "linked" modulo 2 (the Rédei symbol is −1) but are "pairwise unlinked" modulo 2 (the Legendre symbols are all 1). Therefore these primes have been called a "proper Borromean triple modulo 2" or "mod 2 Borromean primes".

History
In the 1960s topological interpretations of class field theory were given by John Tate based on Galois cohomology, and also by Michael Artin and Jean-Louis Verdier based on Étale cohomology. Then David Mumford (and independently Yuri Manin) came up with an analogy between prime ideals and knots which was further explored by Barry Mazur. In the 1990s Reznikov and Kapranov began studying these analogies, coining the term arithmetic topology for this area of study.

See also
Arithmetic geometry
Arithmetic dynamics
Topological quantum field theory
Langlands program

Notes

Further reading

Masanori Morishita (2011), Knots and Primes, Springer, 
Masanori Morishita (2009), Analogies Between Knots And Primes, 3-Manifolds And Number Rings
Christopher Deninger (2002), A note on arithmetic topology and dynamical systems
Adam S. Sikora (2001), Analogies between group actions on 3-manifolds and number fields
Curtis T. McMullen (2003), From dynamics on surfaces to rational points on curves
Chao Li and Charmaine Sia (2012), Knots and Primes

External links
Mazur’s knotty dictionary

Number theory
3-manifolds
Knot theory